The Tun Abdul Razak Chair was established at Ohio University's Department of Southeast Asian Studies in 1980 in honor of Tun Abdul Razak, Prime Minister of Malaysia from 1970 to 1976. The Razak Chair was endowed jointly by a grant from the Malaysian government and matching funds from American firms operating in Malaysia.  It is the first such chair to be established by a foreign government at any North American university.

The Razak Professor, who is a senior Malaysian scholar selected by the Malaysian Ministry of Education in consultation with the Razak Council and Ohio University, has a two-year residency at Ohio. The Razak Professor conducts seminars at Ohio University for undergraduate and graduate students in his or her respective areas of expertise. The professor also organizes the Tun Abdul Razak Distinguished Lecture in his or her second year. The Distinguished Razak Lecture is usually held in Malaysia where it attracts government and corporate participants, as well as Ohio University alumni in Malaysia who number around more than 2400.  The past Distinguished Razak Lectures have showcased Dr Clifton Wharton Jr., former US Deputy Secretary of State, Dr Charles J. Ping, former President and President Emeritus of Ohio University, Tan Sri Mohd Ghazali Shafie, politician and former Foreign Minister of Malaysia, Dr Surin Pitsuwan, former Secretary General of ASEAN, and most recently Dr John Sabraw, Professor of Art at Ohio University.

The first Razak Professor was Syed Muhammad Naguib al-Attas, a Malaysian Muslim philosopher. Ohio University hosted its fourteenth Razak professor, Professor Dr Habibah Ashari, a professor of Education from Universiti Teknologi MARA from June 2011 to July 2014. She is the first professor from UiTM to be appointed as the Tun Abdul Razak Chair-holder, and is only the second woman to be appointed to the prestigious chair in its more than 30 years in existence.  Professor Habibah said that her appointment is an honour not only to her institution but also to women academics who aspire to hold chairships, typically the domain of male academics. The 15th Razak Professor was Prof Jayum Jawan from Universiti Putra Malaysia. The chair is currently vacant as Ohio University and the Malaysian Ministry of Education are still in discussion regarding the appointment.

List of Tun Abdul Razak Chairs and members of the Razak Council

1. Prof. Dr. Syed Muhammad Naquib Al-Attas (1981-1982)
2. Prof. Puan Sri Datuk Dr. Fatimah Hamid Don (1983-1985)
3. Prof. Datuk Dr. Zainal Abidin bin Abdul Wahid (1985-1987)
4. Prof. Dr. Abdullah bin Hassan (1987-1989) 
5. Prof. Datuk Abu Bakar Abdul Hamid (1989-1991)
6. Prof. Dato’ Dr. Sham Sani (1991-1993) 
7. Prof. Dato’ Dr. Ahmad Mahdzan bin Ayob (1993-1995)
8. Prof. Dato. Dr. Mohammed bin Yusoff (1995-1997)
9. Prof. Dr. Mohamed Sulaiman (1997-2000) 
10. Prof. Dato’ Dr. Zakaria Ahmad (2001-2003)
11. Prof. Dr. Abdul Kadir Din (2003-2005) 
12. Prof. Dato’ Mohamad Abu Bakar (2005-2007)
13. Prof. Dato’ Dr. Mohd Salleh Din (2008-2010)
14. Prof. Dr Habibah Ashari (2011-2014)
15. Prof. Dr Jayum Jawan (2015-2017)

Donors to the Tun Abdul Razak Chair at Ohio University
3M Malaysia Sdn Berhad 
Al-Bukhary Foundation (2011) 
American Express Foundation
American International Group Inc.
Bank American National Trust & Savings 
Bristol-Myers (Malaysia) Sdn Bhd
CPC (Malaysia) Sdn. Berhad 
Caltex Oil Malaysia Limited 
Chase Manhattan Foundation 
Citicorp Foundation 
Colgate-Palmolive Malaysia
Exxon Educational Foundation 
Fluor Foundation
Ford Motor Company Fund 
John T. Garnjost
Gen Instrument Malaysia Sdn Bhd
General Electric Company (HQ) 
Gillette (Malaysia) Sdn Berhad 
Goodyear Malaysia Berhad 
I.B.M. World Trade Corp.
I.N.A. Foundation
Interpena Sdn Bhd
Johnson & Johnson Sdn Bhd 
Malaysian Government 
Minnesota Mining & Mfg. Fdn. Inc.
Mobil Oil (Malaysia) 
Monsanto Fund
Motorola Malaysia Sdn Bhd 
Nabisco Grp Holding Cntr. Fund 
NCR Malaysia Sdn Bhd
Ogilvy & Mather Sdn Bhd 
Pacific Bank Berhad
Pacific Tin Consolidated Corp. 
R.C.A.
Sterling Drug (Malaysia) Sdn Bhd
Tan Sri Dato’ Lee Shin Cheng Foundation (2011)
Time Warner Foundation Inc. 
Union Carbide Europe Inc. 
Uniroyal Inc. 
Warner-Lambert Parker-Davis 
Yayasan Sime Darby (2011)

External links 
Tun Razak Chair
Ohio University Department of Southeast Asian Studies
Ohio University Center for International Studies

Ohio University